Orsolya Kasó (born 22 November 1988) is a water polo goalkeeper from Hungary.

She was part of the Hungarian team winning the bronze medal at the 2013 World Aquatics Championships in Barcelona, Spain.

See also
 Hungary women's Olympic water polo team records and statistics
 List of women's Olympic water polo tournament goalkeepers
 List of World Aquatics Championships medalists in water polo

References

External links
 

1988 births
Living people
Place of birth missing (living people)
Hungarian female water polo players
Water polo goalkeepers
Olympic water polo players of Hungary
Water polo players at the 2016 Summer Olympics
World Aquatics Championships medalists in water polo
Universiade medalists in water polo
Universiade silver medalists for Hungary
Medalists at the 2009 Summer Universiade
21st-century Hungarian women